The 2010–11 Louisiana Tech Bulldogs basketball team represented Louisiana Tech University during the 2010–11 NCAA Division I men's basketball season. The Bulldogs, led by fourth year head coach Kerry Rupp, played their home games at the Thomas Assembly Center and were members of the Western Athletic Conference. They finished the season 12–20, 2–14 in WAC play to finish in last place and did not qualify for the WAC tournament.

Roster

Schedule

|-
!colspan=9 style=| Exhibition
 
|-
!colspan=9 style=| Regular season

References

Louisiana Tech Bulldogs basketball seasons
Louisiana Tech
Louis
Louis